A collision course, also known as a kamikaze run, is the deliberate maneuver by the operator of a moving object (or often in Sci-Fi a spaceship) to collide with another object. It is a desperate maneuver since it often damages or destroys both.

Uses in history
Ancient Greek Triremes were reinforced and equipped with bronze rammers, so they could collide with enemy ships to sink them
Admiral Nelson used a similar tactic to attack the French fleet at Trafalgar, to the horror of Captain Hardy, when he ordered the British ships to 'run aboard' (crash into, or just ahead of the ships).
PT-109, a torpedo boat commanded by the future U.S. President, then Lieutenant junior grade John F. Kennedy, was believed to have been rammed intentionally by the Japanese destroyer Amagiri (1930). The destroyer cut the PT boat in half, killing two men and badly injuring another two.   
Kamikaze pilots from Japan used collision course tactics to take out naval vessels or large Bombers in the latter days of World War II.  Such tactics even extended to the construction of dedicated kamikaze aircraft, such as the Ohka.

Fictional uses

 In Space Battleship Yamato (2010 film) the titular ship rams an enemy vessel to destroy it.
 In Star Trek: Nemesis the Enterprise E rams the Scimitar.
 In Star Trek: Deep Space Nine the Jem'Hadar use a kamikaze run to stop large Federation ships, notably the USS Odyssey (NCC-71832) destroyed circa stardate 47990.
 In Star Trek: Voyager episode "Year of Hell" Captain Janeway used USS Voyager to destroy the Krenim weapon ship.
 In J.J. Abrams Star Trek reboot, George Kirk rams the U.S.S. Kelvin into the Narada in order for the shuttlecraft to escape destruction by the Romulans. Spock also rams the Vulcan ship Jellyfish into the Narada in order to detonate the red matter that is on board.
 In Galaxy Quest (a spoof of Star Trek) the NSEA Protector flies at Sarris' ship dragging space mines, feigning a suicidal attack.
 In the Babylon 5 episode "Severed Dreams", the critically damaged EAS Churchill rams the loyalist ship EAS Roanoke, destroying both.
 In the Battlestar Galactica (2004 TV series) episode "Exodus Part 2" the Battlestar Pegasus is rammed into a Basestar. Both ships are destroyed, with a second basestar being destroyed by debris. 
 In Stargate SG-1, Jaffa Ha'tak vessels ram Ori battlecruisers on at least two occasions, but are unable to defeat the superior Ori shields, resulting in the destruction of only the Ha'taks.
 In Stargate Atlantis, two darts destroy the Ancient weapons platform that was going to be used to destroy the ZPM powered Hive Ship.
 In Stargate Universe, Destiny's shields were modified to take a lesser amount of damage from the drones' weapons, but the drones used Kamikaze Runs to penetrate Destiny's shields and damage the ship.
 In Return of the Jedi an A-Wing pilot crashes his damaged fighter into the bridge of a Super Star Destroyer causing it to fall into the Death Star.
 In Independence Day the final air battle which takes place over Area 51, pilot Russell Casse crashes his jet into the spacecraft core which in turn destroys it.
 In Killzone 2, Colonel Jan Templar after being mortally wounded reprograms his flagship New Sun to crash into the Helghan defense grid.
 In Prometheus (2012 film) Captain Janek uses the Prometheus to stop the Engineer ship from escaping and delivering its payload to Earth.
 In the Thunderbirds episode "Sun Probe", the Sun Probe rocket and Thunderbird 3 were both heading nearly straight for the Sun.
 In the Captain Scarlet episode "White as Snow", a reconstructed TVR-17 was on target for Cloudbase.

Use in media
 Collision Course, the 2004 Linkin Park/Jay-Z mashup EP that contained the hit single Numb/Encore
 Collision Course, a 1989 action-comedy film

See also
 Self-destruct
 International Regulations for Preventing Collisions at Sea
 Last Resort

Mechanics
Ideological rivalry